J.C. Hosack was a Scottish international rugby union player, who played for the Lions. He was one of a handful of players who was never capped for his country, who became Lions, in this case, .

He also played for Edinburgh Wanderers.

He was on the 1903 British Lions tour to South Africa.

References
 Bath, Richard (ed.) The Scotland Rugby Miscellany (Vision Sports Publishing Ltd, 2007 )
 Massie, Allan A Portrait of Scottish Rugby (Polygon, Edinburgh)

Scottish rugby union players
Rugby union players from Edinburgh
British & Irish Lions rugby union players from Scotland
Edinburgh Wanderers RFC players